Melissa Horton is a fictional character from the NBC soap opera, Days of Our Lives.

Casting
She was played by child actors Joseph Trent Everett from October 18 to November 29, 1971, Matthew Bowman from December 16 to 29, 1971, and Kim Durso from April 15, 1975, to June 25, 1976. A teenaged Melissa was portrayed by Debbie Lytton from May 31, 1977, to April 17, 1980, and March 16, 1982, to November 29, 1982. Lisa Trusel played an adult Melissa from May 12, 1983, to November 8, 1988, with returns from June 28 to July 4, 1994, November 1 to 15, 1996, May 30 to June 3, 2002; January 14 to 19, 2010, and June 18 to 28, 2010. Camilla Scott played the role from February 14, 1990, to June 13, 1991. Trusel's run as Melissa earned her various nominations including a Daytime Emmy award nomination.

Storylines
Melissa is the child of Jim and Linda Phillips; however, Linda claims that Mickey Horton is the father. Mickey's wife Laura reveals to Linda in private that he is sterile, a fact Mickey himself did not know. Laura had been keeping it from him so he wouldn't discover that he was not the father of her son Mike; Linda reluctantly admits that Jim is Melissa's father.

Melissa later takes the name Anderson following Linda's marriage to Bob Anderson. Melissa becomes a teenager (as a result of soap opera rapid aging syndrome (SORAS). She runs away from her private school, unable to deal with her trouble-making mother Linda, who wanted her back in order to get her hands on Anderson Manufacturing. Melissa ends up in Mickey and Maggie's home, having considered them surrogate parents for several years already. When Linda discovers her there, she tries to have her removed physically, and Mickey and Maggie decide to fight for custody of her. Linda does not show up for the hearing and the judge grants custody to the Hortons. Melissa and her cousin Hope Williams become good friends and Melissa also becomes good friends with Hope's boyfriend Bo Brady. In 1984, Melissa gets involved with gang member Pete Jannings. The relationship has a series of ups and downs, and when Linda returns to town, she tries to sabotage the romance by pretending to have slept with him. She tries to make Melissa think she is going crazy so she could get her hands on Melissa's stock in Anderson Manufacturing. Linda's scheme fails and she decides to leave town, making a last attempt to make amends before departing, which Melissa begrudgingly accepts. Melissa and Pete marry but later divorce when Melissa, an aspiring dancer, falls for her mentor Lars Englund. Her relationship with Lars eventually falls apart after an injury, which also puts an end to her promising dancing career.

Melissa eventually falls in love with Jack Deveraux but is heartbroken when he marries Kayla Brady instead. Melissa is eventually accused of being behind Kayla's poisoning but is cleared. She is one of the few people who stands by Jack after he commits marital rape against Kayla. To the horror of her family and friends, Melissa makes plans to marry Jack after his divorce from Kayla. Shortly before their wedding, Melissa sees Jack with another woman and discovers that he was only using her to make himself look good. She calls off the wedding and denounces Jack to the rest of Salem before leaving town.

Melissa returns two years later and immediately realizes that her cousin, Jennifer Horton, has fallen in love with Jack, who by this time is trying to become a better person. Melissa tries to discourage her cousin from getting involved with her former fiancé and encourages Jennifer's boyfriend Emilio to propose. However, Melissa and Emilio eventually realize they are attracted to one another and get together while Jack and Jennifer are away on the Cruise of Deception. Melissa and Emilio are free to be together after Jack and Jennifer return and reveal that they had become a couple on the cruise. The relationship is short-lived as Melissa accidentally believes to have killed Emilio in a struggle. Melissa eventually leaves Salem with her adoptive sister Sarah Horton, and the two settle in Nashville. In a subsequent visit to Salem, it is revealed Melissa is pregnant. In 1994, Melissa returns for Tom's funeral. In 2002, Melissa returns for the Christening of Hope's son, Zack Brady. In June 2009, Melissa's son, going by the name of Nathan Horton, arrives in Salem as a first-year medical intern at Salem University Hospital, eager to follow in the footsteps of his great-grandfather, Tom.

Melissa later returns for Mickey's funeral. At the memorial, she speaks about the opportunities Mickey and Maggie have given her. She is also able to reunite with her son Nathan and the rest of the Horton family. She makes an appearance in 2010 to say goodbye to Alice.

Days of Our Lives characters
Television characters introduced in 1971
Female characters in television
Horton family